Isla Grande is a small island and corregimiento in Portobelo District, Colón Province, Panama, off the Caribbean coast. It had a population of 1,037 . Its population as of 1990 was 626; its population as of 2000 was 1,055. 
During the right times of year, the water between the island and the mainland provides an excellent surfing environment.
Most of the people found in the town are of African descent and trace it back to black African slaves and those known as Cimarrones. Its historical name was Isla Grande de Bastimentos. It was discovered and named in Spanish "Isle and port of Provisions" by Christopher Columbus in 1502 during his 4th and last voyage. As the Bastimentos together with its nearby port (Puerto de Bastimentos) it played an important role in history as the place where in 1726/7 the British Admiral Francis Hosier with 3,000 of his sailors died of tropical disease whilst anchored with his fleet of 20 ships during the disastrous Blockade of Porto Bello.

See also
List of lighthouses in Panama

References

Corregimientos of Colón Province
Grande
Lighthouses in Panama